Ahmet Rumjahn, JP (c.1861 – 30 November 1925) was a Hong Kong Indian was a broker and estate agent conveying on business on Hong Kong Island.

Rumjahn was born in Hong Kong and was educated at the Queen's College. He entered into business when he was young and became the proprietor of the H. Price & Co., later Gand Price and Co..

Closely involved with community affairs, he was made Justice of the Peace as an honour appreciated by the Indian community in Hong Kong. He became unofficial member of the Sanitary Board in 1903 election, in which he retired after serving for one term.

He moved to Shanghai in 1912 to commence his business there.

Rumjahn was an Indian Muslim. He was the proprietor of the No. 23 Coombe Road from 1903 to 1910. He died on 30 November 1925 at his residence in Shanghai at the age of 64. He had six sons: Sirdar Rumjahn worked for the Omar, A.L., M. Rumjahn in Tientsin, R. Rumjahn in Canton, and N. Rumjahn in Shanghai with his father.

References

1861 births
1925 deaths
Hong Kong businesspeople
Hong Kong Muslims
Hong Kong people of Indian descent
Members of the Sanitary Board of Hong Kong
Alumni of Queen's College, Hong Kong